The following radio stations broadcast on AM frequency 1670 kHz: 1670 AM is a Regional broadcast frequency.

Argentina
 Basilio in Buenos Aires

Canada
 CJEU (AM) in Gatineau, Quebec - 1 kW, transmitter located at

Mexico
 XEANAH-AM in Huixquilucan, State of Mexico
 XECSCA-AM in Tarandacuao, Guanajuato
 XEFCR-AM in Reynosa, Tamaulipas

United States
All stations operate with 10 kW during the daytime and are Class B stations.

External links

 Radio Locator list of stations on 1670

References

Lists of radio stations by frequency